The 1948 United States presidential election in Florida was held on November 2, 1948. Voters chose eight electors, or representatives to the Electoral College, who voted for president and vice president.

Harry Truman won by 87,708 votes or 15.19 percentage points over his Republican opponent Thomas E. Dewey. In culturally Deep Southern North Florida, including the rural and socially conservative Panhandle, Truman was able to rely on having a strong economic program – which Thurmond entirely lacked – to hold off Thurmond's racial appeal. In more cosmopolitan and liberal Central and South Florida – which had seen extensive settlement by Northerners since the war – his economic policies were a winner against Henry Wallace, who received only two percent of the state's vote but did an order of magnitude better in some Tampa precincts.

Dewey nonetheless made dramatic gains upon previous Republican efforts in Florida. By carrying eleven counties, all of which were located in Central and South Florida, mostly in the southwest and on the east coast, he was only the fifth Republican to carry any Florida county at the presidential level since the poll tax' original implementation following the 1888 election. The Dewey counties had in earlier Democratic primaries typically backed "conservative" candidates favoring limited or no economic regulation, due to their lack of dependence on the traditionally "Southern" crops of cotton and tobacco, and would become the most consistently conservative and Republican counties in future presidential elections. Strom Thurmond, who had had to run as a third-party candidate under the "States' Rights" banner, nonetheless won over fifteen percent of the vote. Thurmond carried three counties but ran second in thirty-one others.

This is the last time, that Florida was won by a Democratic presidential candidate by double digits; not even Lyndon B. Johnson in his 1964 landslide election nor Jimmy Carter in 1976 managed to win the state by double digits, despite both men being Southern Democrats. Republicans have won Florida by double digits in six subsequent elections.

This election is also the last time Highlands County have ever voted for a Democratic presidential candidate. Osceola County, which Truman won by two votes, would not vote Democratic again until 1996. Seminole County would not vote Democratic again until 2020. As of 2023, this is the most recent time that Florida voted to the left of Delaware.

Background
With the exception of the 1928 election, when fierce anti-Catholicism and Prohibitionism caused Herbert Hoover to defeat the wet Catholic Al Smith, Florida since the end of the Reconstruction era had been a classic Southern one-party state dominated by the Democratic Party. Disfranchisement of African-Americans and many poor whites had virtually eliminated the Republican Party – only nine Republicans had ever been elected to the state legislature since 1890 – and Democratic primaries were the sole competitive elections.

Under the influence of Senator Claude Pepper, Florida had abolished the poll tax in 1937, leading to steady increases in voter turnout during the following several elections; however, there was no marked increase in African-American voting and Democratic hegemony remained unchallenged: FDR did not lose a single county in the state during his four elections.

Dixiecrat revolt
However, on February 2, 1948, incumbent President Harry S. Truman, fearing that the anti-democratic practices and racial discrimination  of the South would severely denigrate the United States' reputation in the Cold War, launched the first civil rights bill since the end of Reconstruction, along with Executive Order 9981 to desegregate the military. Mississippi governor Fielding Wright had already sounded a call for revolt, which he took to the Southern Governors Conference at Wakulla Springs to say that calls for civil rights legislation by national Democrats would not be tolerated in the South.

After Truman was renominated at the 1948 Democratic National Convention, Southern Democrats walked out and convened at Birmingham, Alabama on July 17, nominating South Carolina Governor James Strom Thurmond for president and Mississippi Governor Fielding L. Wright for vice president.

Due to its smaller proportion of African Americans in its population than in other Southern states, Florida experienced less dissent from the national Democratic Party in response to these actions. Florida Senator Claude Pepper argued that, unless Dwight D. Eisenhower was nominated instead, Truman was the only viable nominee, while Frank D. Upchurch, a long-time adversary of  Pepper, recommended that the renomination of Truman be fought.  Eventually, those opposed to Truman won the primary fight, taking eleven and a half votes out of twenty and control of the state's delegation.

When Florida's Democrats designated their presidential electors, four were pledged against Truman and four to vote for him, although only names of electors were listed. However, after the "States' Rights" convention in July, Miami Herald publisher Reuben Clein filed a civil suit to disqualify the four original electors who planned to vote for Thurmond. Pepper reversed his earlier pledge not to support Truman, and a special session of the state legislature provided separate lists for all candidates, including the progressive former Vice President Henry A. Wallace. Pepper campaigned on Dewey's alleged support of big business over the "little man", and Truman made a whistle-stop tour of the state in mid-October.

Results

Results by county

References

Notes

Florida
1948
1948 Florida elections